Beatrix Blauel-Thomann (born ) is a Swiss wheelchair curler.

She participated in the 2018 Winter Paralympics where Swiss team finished on sixth place.

Teams

Mixed doubles

References

External links 

Beatrix Blauel - Swiss Paralympic
Beatrix BLAUEL-THOMANN - Athlete Profile - World Para Nordic Skiing - Live results | International Paralympic Committee

 Video: 

Living people
1967 births
Swiss female curlers
Swiss wheelchair curlers
Swiss disabled sportspeople
Paralympic wheelchair curlers of Switzerland
Wheelchair curlers at the 2018 Winter Paralympics
20th-century Swiss women